Parco (Chinese: 巴措; Pinyin: Bācuò) is a town in Dêngqên County, Tibet Autonomous Region of China.

See also
List of towns and villages in Tibet

Populated places in Tibet